Moon moth is a general term describing imagos (winged adults) of several Saturniinae species, having as a distinctive trait large round or near-round spots on the forewings and hindwings - hence "moon". 

 Moths of the subfamily Saturniinae
 Actias, a genus native to Asia and America, includes North America Luna moth (Actias luna)
 Argema, a genus native to Africa, includes Comet moth (Argema mittrei)
 Copiopteryx, a genus native to Mexico, Central America and South America
 Eudaemonia (moth), a genus native to Sub-Saharan Africa
 Graellsia isabellae (Spanish moon moth), a species native to Europe

 "The Moon Moth" is a science fiction short story by Jack Vance

Animal common name disambiguation pages